Hideo Jōjō (城定秀夫) (born September 2, 1975) is a Japanese film director and scriptwriter.

Partial filmography
As director
 Natsu Left Home (2014)
  (2013)
 AV Idol (2012)
  (2008)
  (2008)
  (2006)
 Married Women Who Want a Taste (2003)
 Dangerous Drugs of Sex (2020)
 Around the Edge of the Stand (2020)
 Love Nonetheless (2022)
 To Be Killed by a High School Girl (2022)
 Believers (2022)
 Nighttime Warbles (2022)
 Thorns of Beauty (2023)
 Ginpei-cho Cinema Blues (2023)
 After-school Angler Life for High School Girls. (2023)
 S-Friends Part 1 (2023)
 S-Friends Part 2 (2023)

Awards

References

External links
 

Japanese film directors
1975 births
Living people